The 1972–73 season was Colchester United's 31st season in their history and their fifth successive season in the fourth tier of English football, the Fourth Division. Alongside competing in the Fourth Division, the club also participated in the FA Cup and the League Cup.

Manager Dick Graham resigned early in the new season, following two and four defeats wins in the opening six games of the campaign. Jim Smith was appointed his successor in early October, but his first win didn't arrive until mid-November. Colchester endured a very poor season, and were required to seek re-election after finishing 22nd in the league table.

Colchester suffered an early exit in the cup competitions as they were defeated in the first round of the League Cup by Gillingham, and the second round of the FA Cup by Bournemouth.

Season overview
Colchester United held its annual general meeting in September 1972. Following questioning of his tactics by a shareholder, an incensed Dick Graham tendered his resignation as manager. The club had achieved two wins in the first six games of the season, but the other four matches ended in defeat. Dennis Mochan was appointed caretaker manager until a permanent replacement could be found. He took charge of five games, but was unable to improve Colchester's fortunes, with two draws and three defeats in his five games at the helm. An unknown Jim Smith, then-manager of Northern Premier League side Boston United who had just led the team to the title, was appointed Graham's replacement. With Colchester bottom of the Football League after 13 matches with six points, Smith's influence gave United an initial boost, earning the Manager of the Month award for lifting the club off the bottom of the table.

One of Smith's early pieces of business was signing his former Boston forward Bobby Svarc for £6,000 just before Christmas. However, his goalscoring influence did not immediately show, returning eight goals in 20 league outings. Fortunes did not improve for the U's as they finished the season in 22nd position and were required to seek re-election from the Football League. Colchester earned a maximum 48 votes from their fellow League clubs to retain Football League status for another season.

Players

Transfers

In

 Total spending:  ~ £8,750

Out

 Total incoming:  ~ £5,000

Loans in

Loans out

Match details

Fourth Division

Results round by round

League table

Matches

League Cup

FA Cup

Squad statistics

Appearances and goals

|-
!colspan="14"|Players who appeared for Colchester who left during the season

|}

Goalscorers

Disciplinary record

Clean sheets
Number of games goalkeepers kept a clean sheet.

Player debuts
Players making their first-team Colchester United debut in a fully competitive match.

See also
List of Colchester United F.C. seasons

References

General
Books

Websites

Specific

1972-73
English football clubs 1972–73 season